Court of Criminal Appeal may refer to:

Court of Criminal Appeal (England and Wales)
Court of Criminal Appeal (Ireland)
Court of Criminal Appeal (Northern Ireland)
Court of Criminal Appeal (Scotland)
United States Army Court of Criminal Appeals
Navy-Marine Corps Court of Criminal Appeals (United States)
Coast Guard Court of Criminal Appeals (United States)
Air Force Court of Criminal Appeals (United States)

See also
Appellate court
Appeal
Criminal law